Sociedad Deportiva Escoriaza was a Spanish football club based in Zaragoza, in the autonomous community of Aragon.

History
Founded in 1921, the club was inscribed in the Royal Spanish Football Federation in 1929, playing in the regional leagues until 1932. After years of inactivity, it returned to action in 1940, reaching the Tercera División only four years later.

Escoriaza reached the Segunda División for the 1953–54 season, but finished last in its group and was immediately relegated back. After the club's owning company, Material Móvil y Construcciones, S.A., was absorbed, the club was dissolved.

Season to season

1 season in Segunda División
9 seasons in Tercera División

External links
BDFutbol team profile
La Futbolteca profile 
ArefePedia team profile 

Defunct football clubs in Aragon
Association football clubs established in 1921
Association football clubs disestablished in 1954
1921 establishments in Spain
1954 disestablishments in Spain
Sport in Zaragoza
Segunda División clubs